The 2019 Oakland Athletics season was the 119th season for the Oakland Athletics franchise, all as members of the American League, and their 52nd season in Oakland (all at Oakland Coliseum). The A's clinched a spot in the Wild Card Game on September 27; however, they lost to the Tampa Bay Rays in that game 5-1. The 2019 season was the final season the team shared the Coliseum with the Oakland Raiders. The Raiders relocated to Las Vegas prior to the following season leaving the Coliseum as a baseball-only facility for the first time since 1994.

Standings

American League West

American League Wild Card

Record against opponents

Game log

|-style=background:#fbb
| 1 || March 20 || Mariners (Game played in Tokyo)|| 7–9 || Gonzales (1–0) || Fiers (0–1) || Strickland (1) || 45,787 || 0–1 || L1 
|-style=background:#fbb
| 2 || March 21 || Mariners (Game played in Tokyo)|| 4–5 (12) || Rosscup (1–0) || Buchter (0–1) || Strickland (2) || 46,451 || 0–2 || L2
|-style=background:#cfc
| 3 || March 28 || Angels || 4–0 || Fiers (1–1) || Cahill (0–1) || — || 22,691 || 1–2 || W1
|-style=background:#fbb
| 4 || March 29 || Angels || 2–6 || Robles (1–0) || Soria (0–1) || — || 22,585 || 1–3 || L1
|-style=background:#cfc
| 5 || March 30 || Angels || 4–2 || Anderson (1–0) || Peña (0–1) || Treinen (1) || 16,051 || 2–3 || W1 
|-style=background:#cfc
| 6 || March 31 || Angels || 2–1 || Montas (1–0) || Skaggs (0–1) || Treinen (2) || 23,265 || 3–3 || W2
|-

|-style=background:#cfc
||7|| April 1 || Red Sox || 7–0 || Brooks (1–0) || Price (0–1) || — || 12,417 || 4–3 || W3
|-style=background:#cfc
||8|| April 2 || Red Sox || 1–0 || Fiers (2–1) || Sale (0–2) || Treinen (3) || 12,721 || 5–3 || W4
|-style=background:#fbb
||9|| April 3 || Red Sox || 3–6 || Barnes (1–0) || Rodney (0–1) || Brasier (1) || 14,207 || 5–4 || L1
|-style=background:#cfc
||10|| April 4 || Red Sox || 7–3 || Anderson (2–0) || Rodríguez (0–2) || — || 15,095 || 6–4 || W1 
|-style=background:#fbb
||11|| April 5 || @ Astros || 2–3 || McHugh (1–1) || Montas (1–1) || Osuna (2) || 43,165 || 6–5 || L1
|-style=background:#fbb
||12|| April 6 || @ Astros || 0–6 || Miley (1–1) || Brooks (1–1) || — || 34,487 || 6–6 || L2
|-style=background:#fbb
||13|| April 7 || @ Astros || 8–9 || Osuna (1–0) || Treinen (0–1) || — || 34,902 || 6–7 || L3
|-style=background:#fbb
||14|| April 8 || @ Orioles || 4–12 || Cashner (2–1) || Estrada (0–1) || — || 6,585 || 6–8 || L4 
|-style=background:#cfc
||15|| April 9 || @ Orioles || 13–2 || Anderson (3–0) || Means (1–1) || — || 7,738 || 7–8 || W1 
|-style=background:#cfc
||16|| April 10 || @ Orioles || 10–3 || Montas (2–1) || Straily (0–1) || — || 7,974 || 8–8 || W2
|-style=background:#cfc
||17|| April 11 || @ Orioles || 8–5 || Brooks (2–1) || Bundy (0–1) || Treinen (4) || 8,374 || 9–8 || W3
|-style=background:#cfc
||18|| April 12 || @ Rangers || 8–6 || Trivino (1–0) || Martin (0–1) || Treinen (5) || 24,817 || 10–8 || W4 
|-style=background:#bbb
|| – || April 13 || @ Rangers || colspan="9"| Postponed (rain); Rescheduled for June 8 as part of a doubleheader.
|-style=background:#fbb
||19|| April 14 || @ Rangers || 7–8 || Springs (2–0) || Soria (0–2) || Leclerc (3) || 26,350 || 10–9 || L1
|-style=background:#fbb
||20|| April 16 || Astros || 1–9 || McHugh (3–1) || Estrada (0–2) || — || 12,270 || 10–10 || L2 
|-style=background:#cfc
||21|| April 17 || Astros || 2–1 || Montas (3–1) || Miley (1–2) || Treinen (6) || 11,323 || 11–10 || W1
|-style=background:#fbb
||22|| April 19 || Blue Jays || 1–5 || Stroman (1–3) || Brooks (2–2) || — || 15,128 || 11–11 || L1
|-style=background:#fbb
||23|| April 20 || Blue Jays || 1–10 || Gaviglio (2–0) || Fiers (2–2) || — || 31,140 || 11–12 || L2
|-style=background:#fbb
||24|| April 21 || Blue Jays || 4–5 || Hudson (1–1 || Anderson (3–1) || Giles (7) || 16,015 || 11–13 || L3
|-style=background:#cfc
||25|| April 22 || Rangers || 6–1 || Bassitt (1–0) || Minor (2–2) || — || 8,073 || 12–13 || W1
|-style=background:#cfc
||26|| April 23 || Rangers || 11–5 || Montas (4–1) || Lynn (2–2) || — || 10,496 || 13–13 || W2
|-style=background:#cfc
||27|| April 24 || Rangers || 6–5 || Treinen (1–1) || Martin (0–2) || — || 18,610 || 14–13 || W3
|-style=background:#fbb
||28|| April 26 || @ Blue Jays || 2–4 || Giles (1–1) || Petit (0–1) || — || 28,688 || 14–14 || L1
|-style=background:#fbb
||29|| April 27 || @ Blue Jays || 1–7 || Sanchez (3–1) || Anderson (3–2) || — || 22,254 || 14–15 || L2
|-style=background:#fbb
||30|| April 28 || @ Blue Jays || 4–5 (11) || Luciano (1–0) || Treinen (1–2) || — || 18,557 || 14–16 || L3
|-style=background:#fbb
||31|| April 29 || @ Red Sox || 4–9 || Brasier (1–0) || Montas (4–2) || Barnes (2) || 30,866 || 14–17 || L4
|-style=background:#fbb
||32|| April 30 || @ Red Sox || 1–5 || Porcello (2–3) || Brooks (2–3) || — || 31,754 || 14–18 || L5
|-

|-style=background:#fbb
||33|| May 1 || @ Red Sox || 3–7 || Walden (4–0) || Fiers (2–3) || — || 33,708 || 14–19 || L6
|-style=background:#cfc
||34|| May 3 || @ Pirates || 14–1 || Anderson (4–2) || Musgrove (1–3) || — || 16,428 || 15–19 || W1
|-style=background:#fbb
||35|| May 4 || @ Pirates || 4–6 ||  Feliz (1–0) ||  Wendelken (0–1) || Vázquez (9) || 26,447 || 15–20 || L1
|-style=background:#fbb
||36|| May 5 || @ Pirates || 3–5 (13) || Lyons (1–0) || Rodney (0–2) || — || 18,517 || 15–21 || L2
|-style=background:#cfc
||37|| May 7 || Reds || 2–0 || Fiers (3–3) || Mahle (0–5) || — || 11,794 || 16–21 || W1 
|-style=background:#cfc
||38|| May 8 || Reds || 5–4 (13) || Hendriks (1–0) || Stephenson (2–1) || — || 9,096 || 17–21 || W2
|-style=background:#fbb
||39|| May 9 || Reds || 0–3 || Roark (3–1) || Bassitt (1–1) || Iglesias (7) || 19,694 || 17–22 || L1 
|-style=background:#cfc
||40|| May 10 || Indians || 4–3 (12) || Soria (1–2) || Hand (2–2) || — || 36,913 || 18–22 || W1 
|-style=background:#cfc
||41|| May 11 || Indians || 3–2 || Treinen (2–2) || Cole (0–1) || — || 18,278 || 19–22 || W2
|-style=background:#fbb
||42|| May 12 || Indians || 3–5 || Rodríguez (1–2) || Mengden (0–1) || Hand (11) || 18,891 || 19–23 || L1
|-style=background:#fbb
||43|| May 13 || @ Mariners || 5–6 (10) || Brennan (2–2) || Soria (1–3) || — || 12,520 || 19–24 || L2
|-style=background:#fbb
||44|| May 14 || @ Mariners || 3–4 || Leake (3–4) || Anderson (4–3) || Elías (5) || 11,365 || 19–25 || L3
|-style=background:#cfc
||45|| May 16 || @ Tigers || 17–3 || Bassitt (2–1) || Turnbull (2–3) || — || 18,527 || 20–25 || W1
|-style=background:#cfc
||46|| May 17 || @ Tigers || 7–2 || Montas (5–2) || Norris (2–2) || — || 18,746 || 21–25 || W2
|-style=background:#cfc
||47|| May 18 || @ Tigers || 4–1 || Mengden (1–1) || Boyd (4–4) || Treinen (7) || 22,913 || 22–25 || W3
|-style=background:#bbb
|| – || May 19 || @ Tigers || colspan="9" | Suspended (inclement weather). Continuation scheduled for September 6 in Oakland. 
|-style=background:#cfc
||49|| May 20 || @ Indians || 6–4 || Anderson (5–3) || Carrasco (4–4) || Treinen (8) || 12,563 || 23–25 || W5
|-style=background:#cfc
|50|| May 21 || @ Indians || 5–3 || Hendriks (2–0) || Bauer (4–3) || Treinen (9) || 13,705 || 24–25 || W6
|-style=background:#cfc
||51|| May 22 || @ Indians || 7–2 || Montas (6–2) || Rodríguez (1–4) || — || 17,010 || 25–25 || W7
|-style=background:#cfc
||52|| May 24 || Mariners || 6–2 || Trivino (2–0) || LeBlanc (2–2) || — || 12,902 || 26–25 || W8
|-style=background:#cfc
||53|| May 25 || Mariners || 6–5 || Fiers (4–3) || Kikuchi (3–2) || Treinen (10) || 18,975 || 27–25 || W9
|-style=background:#cfc
||54|| May 26 || Mariners || 7–1 || Anderson (6–3) || Leake (3–6) || — || 14,664 || 28–25 || W10
|-style=background:#cfc
||55|| May 27 || Angels || 8–5 || Bassitt (3–1) || Cahill (2–5) || Treinen (11) || 20,409 || 29–25 || W11
|-style=background:#fbb
||56|| May 28 || Angels || 4–6 || Buttrey (3–2) || Soria (1–4) || Robles (6) || 13,060 || 29–26 || L1
|-style=background:#fbb
||57|| May 29 || Angels || 7–12 (11) || Ramirez (2–0) || Trivino (2–1) || — || 21,185 || 29–27 || L2
|-style=background:#fbb
||58|| May 31 || Astros || 2–3 || Rondón (3–1) || Trivino (2–2) || Osuna (16) || 14,519 || 29–28 || L3
|-

|-style=background:#fbb
||59|| June 1 || Astros || 1–5 || Verlander (9–2) || Anderson (6–4) || — || 20,425 || 29–29 || L4
|-style=background:#fbb
||60|| June 2 || Astros || 4–6 (12) || James (3–0) || Trivino (2–3) || — || 23,144 || 29–30 || L5
|-style=background:#bfb
||61|| June 4 || @ Angels || 4–2 || Montas (7–2) || Canning (2–2) || Treinen (12) || 36,009 || 30–30 || W1
|-style=background:#fbb
||62|| June 5 || @ Angels || 9–10 || Robles (3–0) || Trivino (2–4) || — || 36,065 || 30–31 || L1
|-style=background:#cfc
||63|| June 6 || @ Angels || 7–4 || Fiers (5–3) || Skaggs (4–6) || — || 34,109 || 31–31 || W1
|-style=background:#cfc
||64|| June 7 || @ Rangers || 5–3 || Petit (1–1)  || Leclerc (1–2) || Treinen (13) || 25,120 || 32–31 || W2
|-style=background:#fbb
||65|| June 8 (1)|| @ Rangers || 5–10 || Springs (4–1) || Blackburn (0–1) || — || 22,327 || 32–32 || L1
|-style=background:#fbb
||66|| June 8 (2)|| @ Rangers || 1–3 || Sampson (5–3) || Bassitt (3–2) || — || 39,514 || 32–33 || L2
|-style=background:#cfc
||67|| June 9 || @ Rangers || 9–8 || Montas (8–2) || Smyly (1–5) || Treinen (14) || 20,358 || 33–33 || W1
|-style=background:#fbb
||68|| June 10 || @ Rays || 2–6 || Morton (8–0) || Anderson (0–1) || — || 16,091 || 33–34 || L1
|-style=background:#cfc
||69|| June 11 || @ Rays || 4–3 || Fiers (6–3) || Pagán (1–1) || Treinen (15) || 11,132 || 34–34 || W1
|-style=background:#cfc
||70|| June 12 || @ Rays || 6–2 || Hendriks (3–0) || Kolarek (2–2) || — || 17,946 || 35–34 || W2
|-style=background:#fbb
||71|| June 14 || Mariners || 2–9 || Gonzales (7–6) || Bassitt (3–3) || — || 21,387 || 35–35 || L1
|-style=background:#cfc
||72|| June 15 || Mariners || 11–2 || Montas (9–2) || Bautista (0–1) || — || 14,846 || 36–35 || W1
|-style=background:#fbb
||73|| June 16 || Mariners || 3–6 || Leake (6–6) || Trivino (2–5) || Elías (7) || 30,242 || 36–36 || L1
|-style=background:#cfc
||74|| June 17 || Orioles || 3–2 || Fiers (7–3) || Cashner (6–3) || Treinen (16) || 12,345 || 37–36 || W1
|-style=background:#cfc
||75|| June 18 || Orioles || 16–2 || Anderson (7–4) || Ynoa (0–4) || — || 14,310 || 38–36 || W2
|-style=background:#cfc
||76|| June 19 || Orioles || 8–3 || Bassitt (4–3) || Rogers (0–1) || — || 15,341 || 39–36 || W3
|-style=background:#cfc
||77|| June 20 || Rays || 5–4 || Trivino (3–5) || Castillo (1–5) || — || 12,351 || 40–36 || W4
|-style=background:#fbb
||78|| June 21 || Rays || 3–5 || Pruitt (1–0) || Anderson (0–2) || Pagán (4) || 16,126 || 40–37 || L1
|-style=background:#cfc
||79|| June 22 || Rays || 4–2 || Petit (2–1) || Castillo (1–6) || Hendriks (1) || 26,623 || 41–37 || W1
|-style=background:#fbb
||80|| June 23 || Rays || 2–8 || Yarbrough (6–3) || Anderson (7–5) || — || 17,006 || 41–38 || L1
|-style=background:#cfc
||81|| June 25 || @ Cardinals || 7–3 || Wendelken (1–1) || Flaherty (4–5) || — || 40,556 || 42–38 || W1
|-style=background:#cfc
||82|| June 26 || @ Cardinals || 2–0 || Mengden (2–1) || Wainwright (5–7) || Hendriks (2) || 44,871 || 43–38 || W2
|-style=background:#fbb
||83|| June 27 || @ Angels || 3–8 || Canning (3–4) || Anderson (0–3) || — || 40,231 || 43–39 || L1
|-style=background:#cfc
||84|| June 28 || @ Angels || 7–2 || Fiers (8–3) || Ramirez (3–1) || — || 41,913 || 44–39 || W1
|-style=background:#cfc
||85|| June 29 || @ Angels || 4–0 || Anderson (8–5) || Skaggs (7–7) || — || 41,447 || 45–39 || W2
|-style=background:#cfc
||86|| June 30 || @ Angels || 12–3 || Bassitt (5–3) || Heaney (1–2) || — || 37,668 || 46–39 || W3
|-

|-style=background:#bfb
||87|| July 2 || Twins || 8–6 || Mengden (3–1) || Odorizzi (10–4) || Hendriks (3) || 13,926 || 47–39 || W4
|-style=background:#fbb
||88|| July 3 || Twins || 3–4  || Parker (1–2) || Treinen (2–3) || Rogers (11) || 31,570 || 47–40 || L1
|-style=background:#cfc
||89|| July 4 || Twins || 7–2 || Wang (1–0) || Berríos (8–5) || — || 20,836 || 48–40 || W1
|-style=background:#cfc
||90|| July 5 || @ Mariners || 5–2 || Anderson (9–5) || Kikuchi (4–6) || Hendriks (4) || 19,712 || 49–40 || W2
|-style=background:#fbb
||91|| July 6 || @ Mariners || 3–6 || Gonzales (10–7) || Bassitt (5–4) || — || 24,298 || 49–41 || L1
|-style=background:#cfc
||92|| July 7 || @ Mariners || 7–4 || Mengden (4–1) || Carasiti (0–1) || Hendriks (5) || 25,816 || 50–41 || W1
|-style=background:#bbbfff
||-|| July 9 || colspan="8"|90th All-Star Game in Cleveland, OH
|-style=background:#cfc
||93|| July 12 || White Sox || 5–1 || Fiers (9–3) || Nova (4–8) || Hendriks (6) || 18,504 || 51–41 || W2
|-style=background:#cfc
||94|| July 13 || White Sox || 13–2 || Bassitt (6–4) || Covey (1–5) || — || 22,222 || 52–41 || W3
|-style=background:#cfc
||95|| July 14 || White Sox || 3–2 || Hendriks (4–0) || Fry (1–4) || — || 20,350 || 53–41 || W4
|-style=background:#cfc
||96|| July 16 || Mariners || 9–2 || Mengden (5–1) || Gonzales (10–8) || — ||   18,718 || 54–41 || W5
|-style=background:#cfc
||97|| July 17 || Mariners || 10–2 || Bailey (8–6) || Milone (1–4) || — || 19,161 || 55–41 || W6
|-style=background:#fbb
||98|| July 18 || @ Twins || 3–6 || Gibson (9–4) || Petit (2–2) || Rogers (14) || 28,432 || 55–42 || L1
|-style=background:#cfc
||99|| July 19 || @ Twins || 5–3 || Bassitt (7–4) || Harper (3–2) || Hendriks (7) || 31,082 || 56–42 || W1
|-style=background:#cfc
||100|| July 20 || @ Twins || 5–4 || Treinen (3–3) || Rogers (2–2) || Hendriks (8) || 32,720 || 57–42 || W2
|-style=background:#fbb
||101|| July 21 || @ Twins || 6–7 || Stewart (2–1) || Hendriks (4–1) || — || 34,070 || 57–43 || L1
|-style=background:#fbb
||102|| July 22 || @ Astros || 1–11 || Cole (11–5) || Bailey (8–7) || — || 41,534 || 57–44 || L2
|-style=background:#cfc
||103|| July 23 || @ Astros || 4–3 (11) || Petit (3–2) || McHugh (3–5) || — || 39,204 || 58–44 || W1
|-style=background:#fbb
||104|| July 24 || @ Astros || 2–4 || Verlander (13–4) || Bassitt (7–5) || Osuna (23) || 41,838 || 58–45 || L1
|-style=background:#fbb
||105|| July 25 || Rangers || 3–11 || Jurado (6–6) || Anderson (9–6)  || — || 11,854 || 58–46 || L2
|-style=background:#fbb
||106|| July 26 || Rangers || 2–5 || Lynn (13–6) || Mengden (5–2) || Martin (4) || 14,952 || 58–47 || L3
|-style=background:#cfc
||107|| July 27 || Rangers || 5–4 || Bailey (9–7) || Sampson (6–8) || Hendriks (9) || 36,468 || 59–47 || W1
|-style=background:#cfc
||108|| July 28 || Rangers || 6–5 || Treinen (4–3) || Leclerc (1–3) || — || 18,906 || 60–47 || W2
|-style=background:#cfc
||109|| July 30 || Brewers || 3–2  || Treinen (5–3) || Hader (1–4) || — || 17,291 || 61–47 || W3
|-style=background:#fbb
||110|| July 31 || Brewers || 2–4 || Lyles (6–7) || Anderson (9–7) || Hader (24) || 14,864 || 61–48 || L1
|-

|-style=background:#cfc
||111|| August 1 || Brewers || 5–3 || Treinen (6–3) || Hader (1–5) || Hendriks (10) || 17,029 || 62–48 || W1
|-style=background:#cfc
||112|| August 3 || Cardinals || 8–3 ||Fiers (10–3) || Hudson (10–6) || — || 24,851 || 63–48 || W2
|-style=background:#cfc
||113|| August 4 || Cardinals || 4–2 || Roark (7–7) || Wainwright (7–8) || Hendriks (11) || 24,603 || 64–48 || W3
|-style=background:#fbb
||114|| August 5 || @ Cubs || 5–6 || Wick (2–0) || Treinen (6–4) || Phelps (1) || 40,721 || 64–49 || L1
|-style=background:#cfc
||115|| August 6 || @ Cubs || 11–4 || Anderson (10–7) || Lester (9–8) || — || 40,627 || 65–49 || W1
|-style=background:#fbb
||116|| August 7 || @ Cubs || 1–10 || Quintana (10–7) || Bailey (9–8) || — || 41,179 || 65–50 || L1
|-style=background:#bfb
||117|| August 9 || @ White Sox || 7–0 || Fiers (11–3) || Detwiler (1–3) || — || 18,318 || 66–50 || W1
|-style=background:#fbb
||118|| August 10 || @ White Sox || 2–3 || López (7–9) || Roark (7–8) || Colomé (23) || 27,026 || 66–51 || L1
|-style=background:#bfb
||119|| August 11 || @ White Sox || 2–0 || Bassitt (8–5) || Giolito (12–6) || Hendriks (12) || 30,951 || 67–51 || W1
|-style=background:#fbb
||120|| August 13 || @ Giants || 2–3 || Bumgarner (8–7) || Anderson (10–8) || Smith (29) || 36,663 || 67–52 || L1
|-style=background:#cfc
||121|| August 14 || @ Giants || 9–5 || Bailey (10–8) || Beede (3–7) || Hendriks (13) || 39,511 || 68–52 || W1
|-style=background:#cfc
||122|| August 15 || Astros || 7–6 || Diekman (1–6) || Devenski (2–2) || Hendriks (14) || 15,323 || 69–52 || W2
|-style=background:#cfc
||123|| August 16 || Astros || 3–2 (13) || Trivino (4–5) || Sneed (0–1) || — || 22,768 || 70–52 || W3
|-style=background:#cfc
||124|| August 17 || Astros || 8–4 || Bassitt (9–5) || Armenteros (1–1) || — || 21,428 || 71–52 || W4
|-style=background:#fbb
||125|| August 18 || Astros || 1–4 || Greinke (13–4) || Anderson (10–9) || Osuna (27) || 22,372 || 71–53 || L1
|-style=background:#cfc
||126|| August 20 || Yankees || 6–2 || Bailey (11–8) || Germán (16–3) || — || 21,471 || 72–53 || W1
|-style=background:#cfc
||127|| August 21 || Yankees || 6–4 || Fiers (12–3)|| Happ (10–8) || Hendriks (15) || 22,017 || 73–53 || W2
|-style=background:#cfc
||128|| August 22 || Yankees || 5–3 || Roark (8–8) || Tanaka (9–7) || Soria (1) || 24,758 || 74–53 || W3
|-style=background:#fbb 
||129|| August 24 || Giants || 5–10 || Coonrod (3–0) || Petit (3–3) || — || 53,367 || 74–54 || L1
|-style=background:#fbb
||130|| August 25 || Giants || 4–5 || Coonrod (4–0) || Diekman (1–7) || Smith (30) || 47,321 || 74–55 || L2
|-style=background:#cfc
||131|| August 26 || @ Royals || 19–4 || Bailey (12–8) || Keller (7–14) || — || 13,595 || 75–55 || W1
|-style=background:#cfc
||132|| August 27 || @ Royals || 2–1 || Fiers (13–3) || Montgomery (3–7) || Hendriks (16) || 13,669 || 76–55 || W2
|-style=background:#fbb
||133|| August 28 || @ Royals || 4–6 || Hill (2–0) || Treinen (6–5) || Kennedy (23) || 15,049 || 76–56 || L1
|-style=background:#cfc
||134|| August 29 || @ Royals || 9–8 || Petit (4–3) || Sparkman (3–10) || Hendriks (17) || 13,844 || 77–56 || W1
|-style=background:#cfc
||135|| August 30 || @ Yankees || 8–2 || Anderson (11–9) || Kahnle (3–1) || — || 47,265 || 78–56 || W2
|-style=background:#fbb
||136|| August 31 || @ Yankees || 3–4  || Gearrin (1–2) || Trivino (4–6) || — || 44,462 || 78–57 || L1
|-

|-style=background:#fbb
||137|| September 1 || @ Yankees || 4–5 || Ottavino (6–4) || Hendriks (4–2) || — || 42,860 || 78–58 || L2
|-style=background:#cfc
||138|| September 3 || Angels || 7–5 || Petit (5–3) || Ramirez (4–3) || Hendriks (18) || 14,031 || 79–58 || W1
|-style=background:#cfc
||139|| September 4 || Angels || 4–0 || Roark (9–8) || Sandoval (0–2) || — || 12,597 || 80–58 || W2
|-style=background:#cfc
||140|| September 5 || Angels || 10–6 || Puk (1–0) || Buttrey (6–7) || — || 14,013 || 81–58 || W3
|-style=background:#cfc
||48|| September 6 || @ Tigers  || 7–3 || Fiers (14–3) || Reininger (0–2) || — || 15,680 || 82–58 || W4
|-style=background:#fbb
||141|| September 6 || Tigers || 4–5 (11) || Schreiber (1–0) || Blackburn (0–2) || Jiménez (6) || 16,080 || 82–59 || L1
|-style=background:#cfc
||142|| September 7 || Tigers || 10–2 || Bassitt (10–5) || Zimmermann (1–10) || — || 32,623 || 83–59 || W1
|-style=background:#cfc
||143|| September 8 || Tigers || 3–1 || Manaea (1–0) || Norris (3–12) || Hendriks (19) || 24,550 || 84–59 || W2
|-style=background:#fbb
||144|| September 9 || @ Astros || 0–15 || Greinke (15–5) || Fiers (14–4) || — || 38,289 || 84–60 || L1
|-style=background:#cfc
||145|| September 10 || @ Astros || 21–7 || Roark (10–8) || Miley (13–5) || Mengden (1) || 32,100 || 85–60 || W1
|-style=background:#cfc
||146|| September 11 || @ Astros || 5–3 ||Anderson (12–9) || James (5–1) || Hendriks (20) || 32,938 || 86–60 || W2
|-style=background:#cfc
||147|| September 12 || @ Astros || 3–2 || Bailey (13–8) || Verlander (18–6) || Hendriks (21) || 34,024 || 87–60 || W3
|-style=background:#cfc
||148|| September 13 || @ Rangers || 14–9 || Wendelken (2–1) || Gibaut (1–1) || — || 27,813 || 88–60 || W4
|-style=background:#cfc
||149|| September 14 || @ Rangers || 8–6 || Buchter (1–1) || Minor (13–9) || Hendriks (22) || 31,928 || 89–60 || W5
|-style=background:#cfc
|150|| September 15 || @ Rangers || 6–1 ||Manaea (2–0) || Hernández (1–1)|| Luzardo (1) || 26,064 || 90–60 || W6
|-style=background:#fbb
||151|| September 16 || Royals || 5–6 || McCarthy (4–2) || Hendriks (4–3) || Kennedy (30) || 12,902 || 90–61 || L1
|-style=background:#cfc
||152|| September 17 || Royals || 2–1 || Puk (2–0) || López (4–8) || Hendriks (23) || 14,992 || 91–61 || W1
|-style=background:#cfc
||153|| September 18 || Royals || 1–0 (11) || Wendelken (3–1) || Hahn (0–1) || — || 16,714 || 92–61 || W2
|-style=background:#cfc
||154|| September 20 || Rangers || 8–0 || Fiers (15–4) || Minor (13–10) || — || 29,579 || 93–61 || W3
|-style=background:#cfc
||155|| September 21 || Rangers || 12–3 || Manaea (3–0) || Burke (0–2) || — || 29,896 || 94–61 || W4
|-style=background:#fbb
||156|| September 22 || Rangers || 3–8 || Lynn (15–11) || Roark (10–9) || — || 38,453 || 94–62 || L1
|-style=background:#fbb
||157|| September 24 || @ Angels || 2–3 || Peters (4–3) || Bailey (13–9) || Robles (23) || 34,505 || 94–63 || L2
|-style=background:#cfc
||158|| September 25 || @ Angels || 3–2 || Soria (2–4) || Robles (5–1) || Hendriks (24) || 36,865 || 95–63 || W1
|-style=background:#cfc
||159|| September 26 || @ Mariners || 3–1 || Manaea (4–0) || Hernández (1–8) || Hendriks (25) || 20,921 || 96–63 || W2
|-style=background:#fbb
||160|| September 27 || @ Mariners || 3–4 || Warren (1–0) || Hendriks (4–4) || — || 24,092 || 96–64 || L1
|-style=background:#cfc
||161|| September 28 || @ Mariners || 1–0 || Anderson (13–9) || Gonzales (16–13) || Luzardo (2) || 26,401 || 97–64 || W1
|-style=background:#fbb
||162|| September 29 || @ Mariners || 1–3 || McClain (1–1) || Roark (10–10) || Bass (5) || 16,851 || 97–65 || L1
|-

|- style="text-align:center;"
| Legend:       = Win       = Loss       = PostponementBold = Athletics team member

Notes:
  The game was suspended due to rain in the bottom of seventh inning with the score 5–3 in favor of the Athletics.  It was completed on September 6 prior to the regularly scheduled September 6 game in Oakland with the Tigers batting as the "home" team.  The win in the completed game extended Oakland's winning streak they had established from May 16 through May 27.

Postseason

Postseason Game log

|- align="center" bgcolor="ffbbbb"
| October 2 || Rays || 1–5 || Morton (1–0) || Manaea (0–1) || — || RingCentral Coliseum || 54,005 || 0–1 || L1
|-

Postseason rosters

| style="text-align:left" |
Pitchers: 16 Liam Hendriks 31 A. J. Puk 35 Jake Diekman 36 Yusmeiro Petit 40 Chris Bassitt 44 Jesús Luzardo 48 Joakim Soria 50 Mike Fiers 52 Ryan Buchter 55 Sean Manaea 57 J. B. Wendelken 
Catchers: 12 Sean Murphy 19 Josh Phegley 
Infielders: 1 Franklin Barreto 10 Marcus Semien 18 Chad Pinder 23 Jurickson Profar 26 Matt Chapman 28 Matt Olson 64 Sheldon Neuse
Outfielders: 8 Robbie Grossman 20 Mark Canha 22 Ramón Laureano 65 Seth Brown 
Designated hitters: 2 Khris Davis 
|- valign="top"

Roster

Farm system

Notes

References

External links
2019 Oakland Athletics season at Baseball Reference

Oakland Athletics seasons
Oakland Athletics
2010s in Oakland, California
Oakland Athletics